This is a list of clergy in the American Revolution:

 Moses Allen, a minister in Midway, Georgia
 James Francis Armstrong, a Presbyterian minister in Trenton, New Jersey
 Francis Asbury, one of the first two bishops of the Methodist Episcopal Church in the United States
 Isaac Backus, a Baptist preacher
 Nathaniel Bartlett, pastor of the Congregational church of Redding, Connecticut, officiated as military chaplain to Putnam's Division during their encampment in Redding the winter of 1778/79 
 Blackleach Burritt, Presbyterian clergyman in New York
 James Caldwell (clergyman), clergyman in New Jersey
 John Carroll (bishop), A Catholic priest in Maryland, later the first Catholic bishop and archbishop in the United States and founder of Georgetown University
 Myles Cooper, an Anglican priest in colonial New York
 Manasseh Cutler, an American clergyman, a Congress representative and a founder of Ohio University
 Naphtali Daggett, Presbyterian Church pastor
 Jacob Duché, chaplain to the Continental Congress
 Timothy Dwight IV, a Congregationalist minister, and president of Yale College
 William Emerson Sr., a minister and grandfather of Ralph Waldo Emerson.
 John Gano, the founding pastor of the First Baptist Church in New York City
 Pierre Gibault, a Jesuit missionary
 Gideon Hawley, a missionary to the Iroquois Indians in Massachusetts
 Samuel Kirkland, a Presbyterian missionary among the Oneida and Tuscarora people
 John Larkin (Deacon of Charlestown), a First Congregational Church minister in Charlestown, Massachusetts
 William Linn, the first Chaplain of the United States House of Representatives
 Samuel Magaw, clergyman and educator from Pennsylvania
 Frederick Valentine Melsheimer, a Lutheran clergyman and called the "Father of American Entomology"
 Joseph Montgomery, an American Presbyterian minister and a delegate to the Continental Congress from Pennsylvania
 Peter Muhlenberg, a clergyman in Pennsylvania
 John Murray (minister), a pioneer minister; sometimes recalled as founder of the Universalist denomination in the United States
 Samuel Phillips Payson, ministered for the town of Chelsea, Massachusetts
 Richard Peters (priest), the rector of Christ Church in Philadelphia.
 Joseph Roby, minister of Lynn, Massachusetts' Third Parish (now Saugus) Church. A supporter of American independence who marched to Lexington and served on Lynn's Committee of Safety.
 Samuel Seabury, the first American Episcopal bishop, the second Presiding Bishop of the Episcopal Church, USA, and the first Bishop of Connecticut
 John Simpson, Presbyterian minister, Fishing Creek Church, Fishing Creek, SC, graduate of Princeton.
 Josiah Smith (clergyman), a clergyman in colonial South Carolina who championed the causes of the evangelical style of the Great Awakening and later American independence
 William Smith (Anglican priest), the first provost of the University of Pennsylvania
 Elihu Spencer, invited to North Carolina by that colony's provincial congress to convince loyalist congregations to join the patriot cause
 John Witherspoon, a signatory of the United States Declaration of Independence as a representative of New Jersey. He was both the only active clergyman and college president to sign the Declaration
 David Zeisberger, a Moravian clergyman and missionary among the Native Americans in the Thirteen Colonies
 Rev. Joseph Thaxter Jr., Congregational Minister from Edgartown Federated Church on Martha's Vineyard.  Fought in the battle of Concord on the bridge and was injured in the battle at Bunker Hill.  1780–1825.  Gave dedication to plaque at Bunker Hill monument.

References

 
18th-century clergy